Ajay Mitra Shastri (5 March 1934 – 11 January 2002) was an Indian academic, historian and numismatist associated with the Nagpur University.

Early life and education 

A. M. Shastri was born on 5 March 1934 at Guna in Central India Agency, British India (now Madhya Pradesh, India). Originally named Mahendra Kumar, he spent four years at gurukuls (residential schools) at Rajor (Faizabad) and Ayodhya, where he chose the name "Ajay Mitra" from a list of names suggested by his acharya (teacher).

He subsequently joined a Sanskrit school at Baran in present-day Rajasthan, where he passed the Madhyama examination. He also passed the Visharad and Sahitya Ratna exams in Hindi language. Subsequently, he passed the Shastri examination from the Government Sanskrit College, Varanasi, and adopted "Shastri" as his last name. During this period, he also passed Matriculation and Intermediate examinations. In 1953, he obtained the Shastri degree (equivalent to Bachelor of Arts) with Sociology, History and Political Science specializations from the Kashi Vidyapith. In 1957, he obtained a Master of Arts degree in Ancient Indian History and Culture from the Banaras Hindu University.

Career 

In 1957, Shastri became a lecturer at the Department of Ancient History and Culture at the Nagpur University. There, he completed PhD on Brhat-samhita of Varahamihira in 1962. He held various posts at the Nagpur University until his retirement, including Lecturer (1957–1965), Reader (1965–1977) and Professor (1977–1994).

In 1980, Shastri suffered a retinal detachment, and underwent multiple operations. Dr. Ishwarchandra, an eye specialist of Nagpur, and Dr. S. S. Badrinath, an eye surgeon of Chennai, advised him to stop reading and writing completely in order to save his vision. However, Shastri continued to engage in these activities, and wrote several books and articles, besides editing multiple journals. He died on 11 January 2002.

Works

References

Bibliography

Further reading 
 

1934 births
2002 deaths
20th-century Indian historians
21st-century Indian historians
Indian numismatists
People from Guna, India
Academic staff of Rashtrasant Tukadoji Maharaj Nagpur University
Banaras Hindu University alumni